The 2017 WPI Engineers football team represented Worcester Polytechnic Institute in the 2017 NCAA Division III football season. It marked the Engineers' 128th overall season.  The team played its home games at Alumni Stadium in Worcester, Massachusetts. They were led by eighth-year head coach Chris Robertson. This was the first season that WPI competed in the New England Women's and Men's Athletic Conference (NEWMAC) for football.

The Engineers finished the regular season with eight victories and two losses. The eight wins is the second most in school history (the Engineers posted nine wins in 1992), tying the 1983, 1989, and 1990 seasons. WPI was selected to host a bowl game making it their third postseason appearance in school history. The Engineers defeated the SUNY Maritime Privateers 17-3 to win their first bowl game in school history.

Personnel

Coaching Staff

Roster

Schedule
The 2017 schedule was officially released on June 29, 2017. WPI faced all seven NEWMAC opponents: Catholic, Coast Guard, Maine Maritime, MIT, Merchant Marine, Norwich, and Springfield. They also scheduled three non-conference games: Anna Maria of the Eastern Collegiate Football Conference (ECFC), Becker of the Commonwealth Coast Conference (CCC), and RPI of the Liberty League.

On November 13, 2017, the Engineers were selected to host SUNY Maritime of the Eastern Collegiate Football Conference (ECFC) as part of the 2017 New England Bowl Series. 

On August 29, the Engineers placed third in the inaugural NEWMAC Preseason Coaches Poll

Awards and honors

Weekly awards
NEWMAC Football Offensive Athlete of the Week
Blake Rice, QB - Week of October 9, 2017
Sean McAllen, RB - Week of October 30, 2017

NEWMAC Football Defensive Athlete of the Week
Dereck Pacheco, DL – Week of September 3, 2017
Brian Mahan, DB - Week of October 9, 2017
Nick Ostrowski, LB - Week of October 30, 2017
Dereck Pacheco, DL – Week of November 6, 2017

NEWMAC Football Special Teams Athlete of the Week
Spencer Herrington, K/P – Week of September 3, 2017
Spencer Herrington, K/P – Week of October 23, 2017
Spencer Herrington, K/P - Week of October 30, 2017
Spencer Herrington, K/P - Week of November 6, 2017

D3football.com Team of the Week
Brian Mahan, DB - Week of October 9, 2017

D3football.com Play of the Week
Lou Garcia, DB - Week of October 9, 2017

Postseason awards 
NEWMAC Special Teams Athlete of the Year
 Spencer Herrington, K/P
NEWMAC All-Conference First Team
 Luca Cerasani, DL
 Corey Coogan, WR
 Lou Garcia, DB
 Brendan Harty, OL
 Spencer Herrington, K/P
 Sean McAllen, RB
 Sam Malafronte, LB
 Dereck Pacheco, DL
 Austin Pesce, PR
NEWMAC All Conference Second Team
 Sam Casey, DB
 Nick Day, OL
 Erik Fyrer, WR
 Nick Ostrowski, LB
 Blake Rice, QB
NEWMAC All-Sportsmanship Team
 Aaron Hartford, DB
D3football.com All-East Region First Team
 Spencer Herrington, K/P
Worcester Area Football Association Co-Offensive Player of the Year
 Sean McAllen, RB
Worcester Area Football Association Steve “Merc” Morris All-Star Team
 Sam Casey, DB
 Luca Cerasani, DL
 Corey Coogan, WR
 Nick Day, OL
 Lou Garcia, DB
 Brendan Harty, OL
 Spencer Herrington, K/P
 Sean McAllen, RB
 Sam Malafronte, LB
 Dereck Pacheco, DL
 Austin Pesce, PR
 Lain Zembek, FB
New England Football Writers Division II/III All‐New England Team
 Sean McAllen, RB
CoSIDA Academic All-District Football Team (DIII)
 Nick Day, OL
 Dereck Pacheco, DL

References

WPI
WPI Engineers football seasons
WPI Engineers football